The following is the final results of the Iran Division One 1997/1998 basketball season.

Participated teams

Group A
ABFA Shiraz
Dokhaniat Urmia
Fath Tehran
Foolad Mobarakeh Isfahan
Saina Kordestan
Sanat Naft Ahvaz
Zob Ahan Isfahan
Zoghalsang Kerman*
* Zoghalsang withdrew during the season.

Group B
Fajr Gorgan
Foolad Neishabour
Moghavemat Basij Shahrekord
Paykan Tehran
Petrochimi Bandar Imam
Rah Ahan Tehran
Sinjergaz Khorramabad
Tarbiat Badani Khorasan

The top 8 teams qualified for the 1st edition of Iran Super League.

Final standing
Paykan Tehran
Zob Ahan Isfahan
Fath Tehran
Rah Ahan Tehran

External links
 Asia-Basket
 iranbasketball.org

Iranian Basketball Super League seasons
League
Iran